Kapsules was a freeware desktop widget engine for Windows.  It made use of the Windows Scripting Technology, allowing widget designers to use any scripting language that has an ActiveScript engine.  Those widgets were then made available on Kapsules' website. , widgets are available in eight different scripting languages. Kapsules is reliant on the .NET Framework. All versions of Kapsules before and including version 0.9.9.0 have targeted version 1.1 of .NET, and all later versions target version 2.0. 

As mentioned above, widgets could be written in any language for which there is an ActiveScript engine.  Kapsules also supports .NET scripting languages.  This flexibility allows widget designers to use and interface with a much larger codebase, enabling them to interface with a wider variety of existing software components.  Widgets have been written in Python, PHP, JScript, JScript.NET, VBScript, VB.NET, Ruby and Perl.

Kapsules was inspired by Arlo Rose and Perry Clarke's Konfabulator (which has recently been purchased by Yahoo! and rebranded as Yahoo! Widgets).  Both are widget engines with very similar functionality.  Konfabulator was originally written for Mac OS X and later ported to the Windows environment, while Kapsules was designed to use integral components of Windows.  By using a managed framework, Kapsules lets designers choose from one of several scripting languages, while Konfabulator widgets are written exclusively in JavaScript. Also, Kapsules can be installed on a Windows guest account, whereas Konfabulator requires Administrator privileges.

On or around November 9, 2006, the Kapsules website was updated with a single page stating that the site had been hacked. It also said that the developers were "busy" working on an updated version of the application and the website. No updates have been made since the announcement.  The project website and its domain have since been abandoned.

Kapsules authors
Andrew Powell

External links
Kapsules homepage
Kapsules Widget Forge

References
Kapsules homepage on November 9, 2006

Widget engines
Utilities for Windows